FMN reductase (NADPH) (FRP, flavin reductase P, SsuE) is an enzyme with systematic name FMNH2:NADP+ oxidoreductase. This enzyme catalyses the following chemical reaction:

 FMNH2 + NADP+  FMN + NADPH + H+

The enzymes from bioluminescent bacteria contain FMN.

References

External links 
 

EC 1.5.1